St. Louis County is located in the eastern-central portion of Missouri. It is bounded by the City of St. Louis and the Mississippi River to the east, the Missouri River to the north, and the Meramec River to the south. At the 2020 census, the total population was 1,004,125, making it the most populous county in Missouri. Its county seat is Clayton. The county is included in the St. Louis, MO–IL metropolitan statistical area.

After Great Britain took over former French territory east of the Mississippi River, many ethnic French colonists moved west. They settled the area of St. Louis County and founded the city of St. Louis in the late 1700s. The US acquired this territory in 1803 with the Louisiana Purchase.

In 1877 residents of the City of St. Louis voted to separate from the county and become an independent city. In the 1960s, with growing suburban development of Greater St. Louis, the county's population overtook that of the city for the first time. Restructuring of industry resulted in job and population declines in the city, and the county has continued to expand.

Through the decades changing conditions have led many business and political leaders to propose merging the city and county as a single government. In 2019 there was an effort to put the issue to a state-wide vote, but it did not get on a ballot.

History

Colonial settlement and early government

During the 18th century, several European colonial settlements were established in the area that would become St. Louis County. French colonists moved from east of the Mississippi River after France ceded territory to Great Britain after losing the Seven Years' War. It also ceded much of its territory west of the River to Spain.

St. Louis was founded by Pierre Laclède and Auguste Chouteau on February 14, 1764; they became major fur traders in the city. Founded in about 1767 was Carondelet, to the south. It was annexed by the city in 1871. Florissant, then known as St. Ferdinand, was established in 1785 about twelve miles northwest of St. Louis on a tributary of the Missouri River. During the 1790s, the very small settlements known as Creve Coeur and Point Labadie were built north and west of St. Louis.

Upon the sale and transfer of French Louisiana to the United States on October 1, 1804, President Thomas Jefferson suggested the territory retain the districts drawn by Spanish officials during their decades-long rule of the territory after an arrangement with the French. During this time, the first governing body of St. Louis County was established (following the earlier Spanish governors).

This government, called the Court of Quarter Sessions, was composed of Charles Gratiot, Auguste Chouteau, Jacques Clamorgan, and David DeLaunay, all ethnic French or French Canadians; the court held judicial, executive, and legislative power. On October 1, 1812, the District of St. Louis was renamed St. Louis County (exactly eight years after its establishment) during a federal reorganization of the Louisiana Territory's status.

Antebellum growth and early education
After the transfer of Louisiana to the United States, the authority to grant incorporation to municipalities was delegated to the Territory and later was a state power. The first to gain municipal status in St. Louis County was St. Louis, which incorporated on November 9, 1809, under the territorial legislature. It gained city status on December 9, 1822. Only a handful of other municipal incorporations took place prior to the separation of the county and city: St. Ferdinand was granted incorporation in 1829 (and reincorporated as Florissant in 1843), while Bridgeton, a settlement along the Missouri River near Florissant, gained incorporation in 1843.

The towns of Pacific and Kirkwood grew substantially and incorporated in the 1850s, with their growth stimulated by construction of the Pacific Railroad (later the Missouri Pacific Railroad). Pacific, a community along the Meramec River first known as Franklin, straddles St. Louis and Franklin counties; it incorporated as Pacific in 1859. Kirkwood was settled in 1853 after Hiram Leffingwell and Richard Elliott platted and auctioned land along the railroad line; they named their settlement after James P. Kirkwood, who had planned the route of the railroad through the area. Leffingwell organized the town as a planned suburb (the first west of the Mississippi). Kirkwood was granted incorporation by the state in 1865.

Other areas of the county began to be settled during this period but did not incorporate as towns. Among these were Chesterfield, and Gumbo, which were both settled in the 1820s in west St. Louis County. Gravois and Affton were settled in south St. Louis County in the 1850s and 1860s.

The first St. Louis Public Schools were established in the major city in the 1830s. It was a decade and more before some of the settlements of St. Louis County began providing public education. In 1854, the School District of Maplewood was established. It included all of today's Maplewood district, part of what became Webster Groves, Missouri, along the south and southwest, a large part of St. Louis in the east, and to the north up to Clayton Road. The first school, originally called the Washington Institute and later renamed as Maplewood High School, opened as a one-room stone building at the crossing of Manchester Road over the Missouri Pacific Railroad tracks. Another antebellum school district was Rock Hill, which provided a one-room school across from the Rock Hill Presbyterian Church until about 1870.

The first school in Florissant opened in 1819 under the direction of the Religious of the Sacred Heart, a Roman Catholic religious congregation. The instructor, Rose Philippine Duchesne, was a French immigrant who has been described as "one of the foremost educators in the state of Missouri". A second school, initially an Indian school known as the St. Regis Academy, was operated for young boys from 1823 to 1829. The complex included the Jesuit St. Stanislaus Seminary, which continued to operate until 1971. The earliest public school in Florissant was the St. Ferdinand School, which was authorized by the General Assembly in 1845 and operated until 1871 when the Florissant School District was formed.

Government changes and early courthouses
From 1813 to 1830, the county initiated several changes to its government. By an act of the territorial legislature, the Court of Quarter Sessions was succeeded by a panel of three judges of common pleas in 1813. Two years later, this panel was succeeded by a newly created county court in 1815, composed of justices of the peace elected from the county to three-month terms. The St. Louis County Circuit Court (established in 1815 as the judicial branch of the county) was given authority in 1816 over the executive and legislative affairs of the county, superseding the court of justices of the peace.

In 1821, a hybrid County and Probate Court was established and given executive and legislative control, and in 1830, its probate functions ceased. This County Court operated as the government of St. Louis County until public scandals encouraged the state legislature to abolish it and replace it in 1859 with a Board of Commissioners.

Sessions of the County Court and other county governing bodies were held in a variety of locations during this early period. The Court of Quarter Sessions held its first meeting in 1804 at a tavern in St. Louis, then regularly at a building at Third and Plum until 1817. The county seat moved that year to a newly built one-story log cabin on Third Street between Elm and Spruce, followed by a move to the brick Baptist Church at Third and Market in 1820.

The County Court established a commission in 1822 to study a permanent courthouse (previous facilities were rented). In 1823, Auguste Chouteau and John Baptiste Charles Lucas donated two tracts of land that formed a vacant square bounded by Broadway, Fourth, Chestnut, and Market.

Between the summer of 1826 and 1833, a low-roofed two-story brick structure was built fronting Fourth Street; this was the first permanent courthouse for St. Louis County. Within a few years, however, the building's size was inadequate for the county government's needs; the original building was left in place during construction on the new building, which began in 1839. This new courthouse, now known as the Old Courthouse, included a finished rotunda, dome, and west wing by 1843; the 1833 courthouse was demolished in 1851, and by 1856, the east wing of the new courthouse was complete.

Separation of St. Louis and St. Louis County
During the antebellum period, some city leaders began to work to separate the city of St. Louis, the county's largest municipality, from the county. In 1843, a group of St. Louis city residents petitioned the state legislature to separate the two entities. The General Assembly passed a resolution calling for a referendum on the subject among county voters outside the city. This vote held on August 7, 1844, showed a majority of county voters opposed to separation.

Despite the vote, controversy continued and tension mounted between the county government and the city government during the 1840s and 1850s. Much of the dispute involved the double taxation of city residents and their proportionally lesser representation in county government. The reform of 1859, in which the County Court was abolished by the state government and replaced by a Board of Commissioners, was in large part a reaction to city outcry over mismanagement of tax money. More than a name change, the reform expanded the size of the county government council to seven members, with four seats reserved for city representation (but the city at that time had roughly ten times the population of the county, so was still underrepresented in county government). The reform temporarily ameliorated the tensions. In 1863, the General Assembly restored the name of the county government to its former name of County Court.

Despite some reforms, controversy returned and grew during the 1860s. This was largely due to what city residents considered double taxation: by the county and the city for services effectively provided by the city alone. Several plans began to circulate during the late 1860s that would relieve this burden, including home rule status for St. Louis, further reorganization of the County Court to ensure greater representation, city-county government consolidation, and separation of the two entities. The General Assembly considered several plans during this period. In March 1871, it passed a further reorganization of the County Court; the new Court would have an presiding judge elected at-large, four seats reserved to be elected by city residents, and two seats for county residents. This reform, however, pleased virtually no one pushing for reform, and it made little practical difference in the operation of the county government.

A consolidation plan proceeded in the General Assembly in 1871, backed by city political leaders Anthony Ittner and Roderick E. Rombauer. The Missouri Republican newspaper strongly backed the approach, while the Missouri Democrat argued it would lead city leaders into corruption. The latter pressed for a separation plan, support for which was led by David H. Armstrong. The separation plan gained greater support when it became clear that the mistrust between city and county residents precluded consolidation. A citizen group known as the Taxpayers League formed in 1872 to advance the separation cause. City leaders looked to Baltimore, Maryland, which had separated from Baltimore County in 1853, as an example.

The mechanism by which separation took place began in 1875 at the state constitutional convention. At the convention, a committee examined the issues of the St. Louis government, and it summarized the two options facing the region as consolidation and separation. The full convention voted to include a provision in the constitution allowing for separation; the vote was 53 in favor, 4 opposed, 11 absent. Only one member of the St. Louis delegation opposed separation:

In 1877, the City of St. Louis separated from the county, creating an independent city. The city in August 1876 narrowly approved the separation while county residents overwhelmingly opposed the separation. City residents had argued they wanted to be "rid of county taxes and state influence over county government". At the time the city had 350,000 residents while the rural county had 30,000. The rural county also had only 150 miles of gravel roads. Although the results were challenged in the courts, the two jurisdictions were formally separated in March 1877.

Post-separation political issues
The first meeting of the new County Court took place on January 22, 1877, at the home of James C. Sutton, in what is now Maplewood. The three judges appointed a new county clerk, sheriff, and treasurer. They also announced at that meeting that the new Court was functional (obviating the legal standing of the previous County Court, which continued to meet albeit without legal function until July 1877) and the transfer of all county buildings and property in the city of St. Louis to the city government. Thus the county's courthouse in St. Louis became city property. The Court also requested that the city of St. Louis continue to provide police protection to some areas of the county until the county could provide these services.

On January 29, 1877, the Court considered a report that recommended Kirkwood as the new county seat, but did not decide the issue at that time. The Court continued to meet at the Sutton House in Maplewood until February 1877, when it convened at the Des Peres Grange Hall. It agreed then to rent space at the Mount Olive Hotel, in what is now University City, until deciding on a new location for the courthouse. The Court continued to meet at the Mount Olive Hotel from March 1877 to 1879. Throughout 1877, the Court debated the question of the county seat; rejecting several sites, including Kirkwood and Florissant.

In September 1877 the Court accepted the donation of 100 acres of land on Hanley Road by a farmer named Ralph Clayton. In addition to the benefit of donated land, the site was chosen because it was on the route of the Hodiamont streetcar line, which connected from St. Louis to Florissant. An additional four acres were given by M. F. Hanley, and in May 1878, the cornerstone was laid for a new county courthouse. In October 1878 the courthouse donation and streets were platted in what would become the town of Clayton. The new courthouse and jail opened in December 1878, at a cost of $38,000. Two additions were made to the courthouse in 1912 and in 1926.

Growth of education and municipalities
In the years from the Civil War to World War I, relatively few new towns incorporated in St. Louis County; the first to incorporate after the war, Fenton, was incorporated in 1874 in southwest St. Louis County. Webster Groves incorporated in 1896, prompted by residents' demands for a police department after the murder of Bertram Atwater, a commercial artist from Chicago. Webster had earlier been settled in 1853 as a stop on the Missouri Pacific line.

Other incorporations before World War I included University City in 1906 near Washington University in St. Louis; Maplewood in 1908, also along the Missouri Pacific railroad line; Wellston in 1908 in the inner north county; Shrewsbury in 1913 north of Webster Groves; Clayton in 1913 south of University City; and Richmond Heights in 1913 south of Clayton. State law required only that 50% of residents agree to incorporation via a petition for a legal incorporation to take place; the county government had no ability to restrict the incorporation if the 50% threshold were met. Significant suburban growth in the early 20th century stimulated a rapid increase in the number of incorporations after 1935.

After the Civil War, dozens of school districts opened in St. Louis County to provide basic primary education. In Eureka, along the Missouri Pacific line to Pacific, a one-room log school opened in the town in 1870, which expanded to two stories and four rooms in about 1900. In the towns of Old Orchard and Webster Groves along the Missouri Pacific line, schools opened in 1867 and 1868, respectively. In Kirkwood, private schools began operating within a few years of the first settlers purchasing lots in 1853; in the early 1860s, these included the Kirkwood Seminary (which closed in 1889), the Kirkwood Military Academy, St. Peter Catholic School, and Concordia Lutheran School. The first public schools in Kirkwood opened in 1866 as part of the newly formed Kirkwood School District; the district provided two years of high school from 1873 and opened a four-year Kirkwood High School in 1896.

In some areas, formerly private schools became part of new public districts. In Florissant, the St. Ferdinand School (opened in 1845) became part of the Florissant School District in 1871, although it continued to be staffed by nuns. The first public school in the newly formed district opened in 1876 near St. Ferdinand and Washington Streets. In Ballwin, a school opened in 1855 by German Methodists was bought by a newly formed Ballwin School District in 1869. The one-room schoolhouse operated until 1900 when a two-room building opened as a replacement.

Post-World War II era
A new courthouse was built in Clayton in 1945 (it serves as the 21st-century County Police headquarters). The original 1878 courthouse was torn down in 1971 to be replaced by county government plaza and modern six-story courthouse.

Several changes took place in St. Louis County education after World War II. The Florissant School District and the Ferguson School District merged in October 1951 to form the Ferguson-Florissant School District. As part of a court-ordered desegregation plan, in 1975 the Ferguson-Florissant district annexed the Kinloch and the Berkeley school districts to combine the schools.

In 1955, St. Louis County established the St. Louis County Police Department, with jurisdiction throughout the county. In 1977, St. Louis County was terrorized by three car bombings, which killed two people. The bomber was never caught.

In 1988 the Board of Freeholders proposed consolidating the county's 89 municipalities into 37 cities, eliminating all unincorporated areas. The vote in June 1989 was challenged by numerous groups on grounds questioning the board's constitutional authority. On June 25, days after the scheduled vote would have occurred, the U.S. Supreme Court unanimously overturned the Missouri Supreme Court, arguing the board's land ownership requirement violated the U.S. Constitution's Equal Protection Clause.

The county passed the city in population in the 1970 census when it had 951,353 compared to the city's 622,236. Industrial restructuring cost the city many jobs and residents. By the 2010 census, the city had fewer people than in the 19th century.

Geography

Colloquially, St. Louis County is often divided into Mid, North, West, and South sections. North County lies north of Interstate 70, West County lies west of Interstate 270, South County lies south of Interstate 44 and Mid County lies in the middle of the three main bordering highways (I-70, I-270 & I-44) and the St. Louis county-city line.

Natural boundaries
The Missouri River forms the northern border with St. Charles County, exclusive of a few areas where the river has changed its course. The Meramec River forms most of its southern border with Jefferson County. To the east is the City of St. Louis and the Mississippi River. The western boundary with Franklin County is the north–south line where the distance between the Meramec and Missouri rivers is the shortest, bisecting the city of Pacific, roughly two blocks east of Hwy OO/F (First street).

Topography
The foothills of the Ozark Mountains begin in southwestern St. Louis County, with most of the rest of the county being a fairly level plateau. This western part of the county is the least developed, due to rugged topography. Bluffs along the Mississippi in the south of the county rise about 200–300 feet above the river. A major floodplain area is the Chesterfield Valley, in the western part of the county, along the Missouri River. It was formerly called "Gumbo Flats" after its rich, dark soil; it was submerged by at least ten feet of water during the Great Flood of 1993. The Corps of Engineers constructed a higher levee, and the county has permitted construction in the floodplain.

The Columbia Bottom is a floodplain in the northeast of the county at the confluence of the Mississippi and Missouri rivers; this is preserved as a conservation area open to the public. The Missouri Bottom area between the two other floodplains had been developed for agriculture, but it is being increasingly developed for residential, business, and industry. The River des Peres drains the interior of the county before flowing into constructed underground channels into the City of St. Louis. It was allowed to resurface, where it forms the boundary between southern portions of St. Louis City and St. Louis County. Other streams include Coldwater Creek, Bonhomme Creek, and Creve Coeur Creek, flowing into the Missouri River; Keifer Creek, Fishpot Creek, and Grand Glaize Creek, flowing into the Meramec River; Deer Creek and Gravois Creek, flowing into the River des Peres; and Maline Creek, flowing into the Mississippi River.

Geology
The bedrock is mainly limestone and dolomite, and much of the county near the rivers is karst terrain, with numerous caves, sinkholes, and springs. No igneous or metamorphic rock is exposed on the surface. A major outcropping of the St. Peter Sandstone formation, a fine white sandstone used for making clear glass, is mined in the southwest corner of the county in Pacific. Brick clay mining was once a major industry in the county. The Charbonier Bluff along the Missouri River is an outcropping of coal and was used a fueling station for steamboats. The "St. Louis Anticline", an underground formation, has small petroleum deposits in the north part of the county.

Flora and fauna
Before European settlement, the area was prairie and open parklike forest, maintained by Native Americans via burning. Trees are mainly oak, maple, and hickory, similar to the forests of the Ozarks; common understory trees include eastern redbud, serviceberry, and flowering dogwood. Riparian areas are heavily forested with mainly American sycamore. By the 1920s most of the timber in the county was harvested. Since that time, large parks and undeveloped areas in the western and southern parts of the county have grown dense forest cover. Old pastures are usually colonized with eastern red cedar. Most of the residential area of the county is planted with large native shade trees. In autumn, the changing color of the trees is notable. St. Louis County has the most recorded native species of plants in the state, but this is probably due to the intensive botanical research done in the area. Most species here are typical of the Eastern Woodland, but some southern species are found in swampland, and typical northern species survive in sheltered hollows. Invasive species, most notably Japanese honeysuckle, are common in some homesteads converted to parks; these are actively removed.

Large mammals include growing populations of whitetail deer and coyotes, which are becoming increasingly urbanized. Eastern gray squirrel, cottontail rabbit, and other rodents are abundant, as well as opossum, beaver, muskrat, raccoon, and skunk. Large bird species include wild turkey, Canada goose, mallard duck, various raptors like the turkey vulture and red-tailed hawk, as well as shorebirds, including the great egret and great blue heron. Winter populations of bald eagles are found by the Mississippi River around the Chain of Rocks Bridge. The county is on the Mississippi Flyway, used by migrating birds, and has a large variety of small bird species, common to the eastern U.S. The Eurasian tree sparrow, an introduced species, is limited in North America to the counties surrounding St. Louis.

Frogs are commonly found in the springtime, especially after extensive wet periods. Common species include American toad and species of chorus frogs, commonly called "spring peepers", that are found in nearly every pond. Some years have outbreaks of cicadas or ladybugs. Mosquitos and houseflies are common insect nuisances; because of this, windows are nearly universally fitted with screens, and "screened-in" porches are common in homes of the area. Populations of honeybees have sharply declined in recent years, and numerous species of pollinator insects have filled their ecological niche.

Climate

St. Louis County has a mix of a humid subtropical climate and a humid continental climate, with neither large mountains nor large bodies of water to moderate its temperature. The area is affected by both cold Canadian Arctic air, and also hot, humid air from the Gulf of Mexico. The county has four distinct seasons. Spring is the wettest season and produces erratic severe weather ranging from tornadoes to winter storms. Summers are hot, and the humidity can cause the heat index to rise to temperatures above . Fall is mild, with lower humidity and can produce intermittent bouts of heavy rainfall with the first snow flurries usually forming in late November. Winters are cool to cold with periodic snow and temperatures often below freezing. Winter storm systems, such as Alberta clippers, can bring days of heavy freezing rain, ice pellets, and snowfall.

Winter is the driest season, averaging about 6 inches of total precipitation. Springtime (March through May), is typically the wettest season, with under 10.5 inches. Dry spells of one or two weeks' duration are common during the growing seasons.

Thunderstorms can be expected on 40 to 50 days per year. A few of them will be severe with locally destructive winds and large hail, and occasionally accompanied by tornadoes. A period of unseasonably warm weather late in Autumn known as Indian summer is common—roses will still be in bloom as late as November or early December in some years.

Other geography
The largest natural lake in the state is Creve Coeur Lake. It was originally an oxbow of the nearby Missouri River and is now the centerpiece of a popular county park.

Manchester Road (Route 100) follows an ancient path westward out of St. Louis, following the boundary between the Missouri and Meramec watersheds. It is one of only two routes to leave the county without crossing any rivers (the other being State Highway T).

The Sinks is a karst area in the far northern part of the county, with numerous sinkholes.

Demographics

As of the census of 2010, there were 998,954 people. There were 404,765 households with 263,423 family households. The racial makeup of the county was 68.3% White (66.9% Non-Hispanic White), 35.3% African American, 0.2% Native American, 3.5% Asian (1.1% Asian Indian, 1.0% Chinese, 0.3% Filipino, 0.3% Korean, 0.3% Vietnamese, 0.1% Japanese, 0.4% Other), 0.03% Pacific Islander, 0.9% from other races, and 1.9% from two or more races and 2.5% Hispanic or Latino (1.5% Mexican, 0.2% Puerto Rican, 0.1% Cuban, 0.8% Other).

There were 404,765 households, out of which 31.0% had children under the age of 18 living with them, 51.00% were married couples living together, 12.70% had a female householder with no husband present, and 33.00% were non-families. 28.00% of all households were made up of individuals, and 10.10% had someone living alone who was 65 years of age or older. The average household size was 2.47 and the average family size was 3.05.

In the county, the age distribution of the population shows 25.20% under the age of 18, 8.30% from 18 to 24, 29.00% from 25 to 44, 23.50% from 45 to 64, and 14.10% who were 65 years of age or older. The median age was 38 years. For every 100 females, there were 90.00 males. For every 100 females age 18 and over, there were 85.70 males.

The median income for a household in the county was $58,532, and the median income for a family was $72,680. Males had a median income of $45,714 versus $30,278 for females. The per capita income for the county was $27,595. About 5.00% of families and 6.90% of the population were below the poverty line, including 9.30% of those under age 18 and 5.30% of those age 65 or over.

Economy
As of 2009, the largest employment sectors in St. Louis County are education and health (25.2%), trade and transportation (19.6%), and professional business services (12.7%). The county also has the highest per capita income in Missouri ($49,727), and nearly one-fourth of the state workforce is employed in St. Louis County, but it accounts for 27% of the state's wages. It is home to the eighth-strongest market for technology hiring, and the world's largest concentration of plant science Ph.D.'s. The St. Louis County Economic Council is the economic development agency of St. Louis County, and it is operated under the authority of the St. Louis County government. Among the largest employers in the county are Boeing (16,000 employees), Washington University in St. Louis (13,200 employees), and SSM Healthcare (12,400 employees). As of 2013, Express Scripts has approximately 4,500 employees, with a planned expansion of 1,500 jobs to be added over the five years from 2013 to 2018.

Unemployment in St. Louis County is well below the national rate of 7.7% (November 2012) at 6.5% (October); for monthly unemployment numbers since June 2012, see below:

Arts and culture

Parks and recreation
St. Louis County owns and maintains more than 40 parks as part of its county park system, including playgrounds and nature preserves. It also operates several recreation centers, the National Museum of Transportation, and the Affton Community Center. In addition to parks owned by St. Louis County, the county is home to three Missouri state parks: Babler, Castlewood, and Route 66 State Park, and part of the Big Muddy National Fish and Wildlife Refuge and the Ulysses S. Grant National Historic Site. Several municipalities in the county also own and maintain their own park systems.

Government
St. Louis County government is divided between executive power vested in the County Executive and legislative power vested in the County Council. The current county executive is Sam Page, who was appointed on April 29, 2019. The county executive's term is four years without term limits, and the position is elected by the population of the entire county. The council consists of seven members elected from separate districts within the county, with four-year terms beginning on January 1 following elections. In 1950, St. Louis County became the first Missouri county to adopt a home-rule charter under the Missouri Constitution, and the current charter was adopted by voters on November 6, 1979.

Crime and public safety
The St. Louis County Police Department operates under the authority of the St. Louis County Board of Police Commissioners and is the largest law enforcement agency in St. Louis County. Although it is directly responsible for law enforcement in unincorporated areas of the county, several municipalities contract with the county police for public safety services. Municipalities that maintain service agreements with the county police are Black Jack, Fenton, Ferguson, Grantwood Village, Green Park, Hanley Hills, Jennings, Marlborough, Norwood Court, Pasadena Hills, Twin Oaks, Valley Park, Vinita Terrace, Wilbur Park, and Wildwood. A total of 58 of the 90 municipalities in the county maintain their own police departments. Eighty-one of the local towns run their own courts.

St. Louis County fire services are provided by 20 municipal fire departments and 23 fire protection districts. The fire protection districts exist as independent, taxing governments that are unrelated to the St. Louis County government, while the municipal fire departments are funded through municipal taxes and are administered by their respective cities.

Politics

As of March 2016, there were 648,073 registered voters in St. Louis County, down from 708,283 registered voters in April 2013. At the federal level, the county is represented by Democrat Cori Bush of the 1st district, and Republican Ann Wagner of the 2nd district. Since 1992, the county has favored Democratic candidates in the presidential elections. Democrats are generally strongest in the northern portion of the county, which has a high Black population, while Republicans have historically dominated the western and southern parts of the county. In recent years however, Republicans have seen the western and southern portion of the county, made up of suburbs, become much more competitive. St. Louis County is a diverse, college-educated, suburban, and affluent county, with a large Black population, as well as a new influx of Asian Americans. These factors in recent years have pushed the county to become safer for Democrats. Historically, the Republican voters in this area were more moderate voters, fiscally conservative yet socially liberal. St Louis County overall is a Democratic stronghold, having voted for the Democratic presidential nominee in each election since 1992, and with increasing margins since 2000. In 2004, 2012, 2016, and 2020, it was only one of four counties in the state to vote Democratic. In 2020, Joe Biden won the county with over 60% of the vote, the best ever showing for a Democrat in the county. 
As of the 2022 elections, of the five senators (who have residences in St. Louis County) elected to the Missouri Senate, four are Democrats and one is a Republican. Of the 27 representatives elected to the Missouri House of Representatives, 19 are Democrats and 8 are Republicans. All of North County elects Democrats to the Missouri General Assembly, most of Mid County also elect Democrats, while most of West County and South County elects Republicans.

Education
Education in St. Louis County is provided by 23 public school districts, 20 private high schools, both a unified public library system and several municipal libraries, and several colleges and universities. Several of the school districts in the county also maintain a voluntary student transfer agreement with the St. Louis Public Schools that allows county residents to attend magnet schools in the city of St. Louis.

Public Schools
School districts include:

Special School District of St. Louis County (SSD) operates schools for differently abled students.

Private Schools

Higher Education

Library
St. Louis County libraries include the unified St. Louis County Library and several municipal library systems.

Infrastructure

Transportation

Major freeways and highways

Health care
In 1927, a $1 million bond was issued allocating funds for the construction of the first St. Louis County Hospital. Construction of the 200-bed, the non-segregated hospital began in 1929 in the city of Clayton. The hospital opened in July 1931 and ran until June 1986.

Current list of hospitals in St. Louis County:

Communities

One-third of the county population lives in unincorporated areas, for which the county government provides services such as zoning, code enforcement, refuse disposal, and police protection. In addition to the county-level government, there are 90 municipal governments in St. Louis County that also provide services. These vary widely in population and area. The smallest towns in population are Champ with a 2010 population of 13, Country Life Acres (population 74), and Mackenzie (population 134); 14 county municipalities have a 2010 population under 500, and fewer than a third exceed 10,000.
 
St. Louis County municipalities include:

Cities

Ballwin
Bella Villa
Bellefontaine Neighbors
Berkeley
Beverly Hills
Black Jack
Breckenridge Hills
Brentwood
Bridgeton
Calverton Park
Charlack
Chesterfield
Clarkson Valley
Clayton (county seat)
Cool Valley
Country Club Hills
Crestwood
Creve Coeur
Crystal Lake Park
Dellwood
Des Peres
Edmundson
Ellisville
Eureka
Fenton
Ferguson
Flordell Hills
Florissant
Frontenac
Glendale
Green Park
Greendale
Hazelwood
Huntleigh
Jennings
Kinloch
Kirkwood
Ladue
Lakeshire
Manchester
Maplewood
Maryland Heights
Moline Acres
Normandy
Northwoods
Oakland
Olivette
Overland
Pacific (mostly in Franklin County)
Pagedale
Pasadena Hills
Pine Lawn
Richmond Heights
Rock Hill
Shrewsbury
St. Ann
St. John
Sunset Hills
Town and Country
Twin Oaks
University City
Valley Park
Velda City
Velda Village Hills
Vinita Park
Warson Woods
Webster Groves
Wellston
Wildwood
Winchester
Woodson Terrace

Villages

Bellerive
Bel-Nor
Bel-Ridge
Champ
Country Life Acres
Glen Echo Park
Grantwood Village
Hanley Hills
Hillsdale
Marlborough
Norwood Court
Pasadena Park
Riverview
Sycamore Hills
Uplands Park
Westwood
Wilbur Park

Census-designated places

Affton
Castle Point
Concord
Glasgow Village
Lemay
Mehlville
Oakville
Old Jamestown
Sappington
Spanish Lake

Townships
 Airport
 Bonhomme
 Chesterfield
 Clayton
 Concord
 Creve Coeur
 Ferguson
 Florissant
 Gravois
 Hadley
 Jefferson
 Lafayette
 Lemay
 Lewis and Clark
 Maryland Heights
 Meramec
 Midland
 Missouri River
 Normandy
 Northwest
 Norwood
 Oakville
 Queeny
 Spanish Lake
 St. Ferdinand
Tesson Ferry
University
 Wildhorse

Unincorporated communities

 Ascalon
 Carsonville
 Earth City
 Fort Belle Fontaine
 Glencoe
 Grover
 Mackenzie
 Peerless Park
 Pond
 St. George
 Sherman
 Times Beach

See also
 List of counties in Missouri
 National Register of Historic Places listings in St. Louis County, Missouri

References

External links

St. Louis County profile
St. Louis County Government 
St. Louis County Municipalities page
St. Louis climate, from the National Weather Service
St. Louis County Economic Council
 Digitized 1930 Plat Book of St. Louis County  from University of Missouri Division of Special Collections, Archives, and Rare Books
 

 
1812 establishments in Missouri Territory
Populated places established in 1812
Missouri counties on the Mississippi River
Missouri counties on the Missouri River
Regions of Greater St. Louis